Soave may refer to:

 Soave, Veneto, commune in Veneto region, Italy
 Soave (wine), a dry white wine from Veneto region
 Moses Soave (1820–1882), Italian Hebraist
 Robby Soave, American libertarian author and journalist